Jois is a surname from Indian state of Karnataka. It is mainly found among Hindus of the Brahmin community.

Notable people
Notable people with the surname include:

K. Pattabhi Jois (1915–2009), Indian yoga teacher and Sanskrit scholar
M. N. Jois (1905–2002), Indian freedom fighter from Karnataka
R. Sharath Jois (born 1971), Indian teacher, practitioner and lineage holder (paramaguru) of Ashtanga Yoga
Rama Jois (1932–2021), Indian chief justice
Venky Jois (born 1993), Australian professional basketball player

References